Sharvani Pillai is an Indian Maharashtrian actress, well known for her role in the Marathi serial Avantika as Sanika and in the year 1998 film Tu Tithe Mee. She is originally from Maharashtra, India and has also played roles in regional Marathi daily soaps and other Bollywood movies.

Television
Sharvani has been a part of many televisions soap in the earlier part of her career. Most of the characters she has played so far have been girl next door roles. With roles in Damini, Avantika, Tujha Ni Majha Ghar Shrimantacha and Ambat Goad, she became a regular on the television screen. She played the second lead in Avantika. She has also worked in Duniya, a Hindi sitcom. She is currently appeared in Mulgi Zali Ho as a lead. She played Sakvarbai in marathi drama Swarajyarakshak Sambhaji.

Regional films
Sharvani gained stardom due to her role in Tu Tithe Mee. She played the role of the daughter in law of the main protagonist, played by veteran Marathi actor, Mohan Joshi. She also worked in marathi film "nishani dawa angtha".

Bollywood
Sharvani played a character in Atithi Tum Kab Jaoge starring Paresh Rawal and Ajay Devgn.

Marathi drama
She also plays a lead role in Marathi Stage drama Makadachya Haati Champagne and Alibaba ani Chalishitale Chor.

Filmography

References

External links
 

Indian film actresses
Actresses in Marathi cinema
Marathi people
Actresses in Hindi cinema
Indian television actresses
Living people
Actresses from Mumbai
Year of birth missing (living people)